The 2020 Phoenix mayoral election took place on November 3, 2020, to elect the Mayor of Phoenix, Arizona. The election was held concurrently with elections to City Council Districts 1, 3, 5, and 7.

The election is officially nonpartisan. Incumbent mayor Kate Gallego was re-elected with an absolute majority of the vote. Therefore, a runoff election was not held on March 9, 2021.

Incumbent mayor Kate Gallego was first elected in a 2019 special election held due to the resignation of mayor Greg Stanton.

Candidates

Declared
 Kate Gallego, incumbent Mayor
 Merissa Hamilton, businesswoman and chair of the Arizona State Legislature sub-committee on policing
 Tim Seay, businessman
 Juan Schoville, indie music producer & martial artist (Write-in)
 Joshua "Crisco Kidd" Carmona, radio personality of 98.3 FM (Write-in)

General election

Results

References

External links
 Kate Gallego (D) for Mayor
 Merissa Hamilton (R) for Mayor
 Tim Seay (D) for Mayor

2020 Arizona elections
Mayoral elections in Phoenix, Arizona
2020 United States mayoral elections